The H-class trams were purpose built single truck, open cross bench cars built at Randwick Tramway Workshops as tourist cars for the City - Bondi Beach/Coogee and City - La Perouse/Botany services.

They later moved to Ridge Street Tram Depot to operate on the Neutral Bay line and again to Rushcutters Bay to operate on the Watsons Bay line.

References

Further reading

External links

Trams in Sydney
Tram vehicles of Australia